This is a list of listed buildings in the parish of Kilmallie in Highland, Scotland.

Key

List 

|}

See also 
 List of listed buildings in Highland

Notes

General references 
 All entries, addresses and coordinates are based on data from Historic Scotland. This data falls under the Open Government Licence.

Citations 

Kilmallie